Sir David Douglas Reid, 1st Baronet,  (24 August 1872 – 23 March 1939) was the Unionist Member of Parliament for Down from 1922 until his death in 1939.

Only son of Joseph Reid, of 22 Elmwood Avenue, Belfast, he attended Queens College, Belfast and New College, Oxford, graduating with 1st Class Honours in History. He then became a barrister at the Inner Temple and was called to the Bar in 1898. He contested East Tyrone in 1910 before becoming a Unionist Member of Parliament (MP) for East Down from 1918 to 1922, when the constituency was abolished. He was Chairman of the Ulster Unionist Party at Westminster.

In 1936, when appointed Sheriff of Down, he was created a Baronet, of Rademon. (Prior to his creation as a baronet, he was known as "D. D. Reid"). Upon his death the baronetcy became extinct.

Sir David died in Brown's Hotel, London and was buried in Kilmore, Crossgar, Co. Down.

References

External links 
 
 

1872 births
1939 deaths
Alumni of New College, Oxford
Ulster Unionist Party members of the House of Commons of the United Kingdom
UK MPs 1918–1922
UK MPs 1922–1923
UK MPs 1923–1924
UK MPs 1924–1929
UK MPs 1929–1931
UK MPs 1931–1935
UK MPs 1935–1945
Members of the Parliament of the United Kingdom for County Down constituencies (1801–1922)
Members of the Parliament of the United Kingdom for County Down constituencies (since 1922)
Baronets in the Baronetage of the United Kingdom
High Sheriffs of Down